Lipulekh is a Himalayan pass on the border between India's Uttarakhand state and the Tibet region of China, near their trijunction with Nepal. Nepal has ongoing claims to the southern side of the pass, called Kalapani territory, which is controlled by India. The pass is near the Chinese trading town of Taklakot (Purang) in Tibet and used since ancient times by traders, mendicants and pilgrims transiting between India and Tibet. It is also used by pilgrims to Kailas and Manasarovar.

Tourism
This pass links the Byans valley of Uttarakhand, India with the Tibet Autonomous Region of China, and forms the last territorial point in Indian territory. The Kailash Mansarovar Yatra, a Hinduism pilgrimage to Mount Kailash and Lake Manasarovar, traverses this pass. Lipulekh pass is connected to Chang Lobochahela, near the old trading town of Purang (Taklakot), in Tibet.

India-China Trading Post
The pass was the first Indian border post to be opened for trade with China in 1992. This was followed by the opening of Shipki La, Himachal Pradesh in 1994 and Nathu La, Sikkim in 2006. Presently, Lipulekh Pass is open for cross-border trade every year from June through September.

Products cleared for export from India include jaggery, misri, tobacco, spices, pulses, fafar flour, coffee, vegetable oil, ghee and various miscellaneous consumable items. The main imports into India include sheep wool, passam, sheep, goats, borax, yak tails, chhirbi (butter) and raw silk.

India-China BPM (Border Personnel Meeting) point 
In 2014, India and China discussed using the pass as an additional official Border Personnel Meeting point between the Indian Army and the People's Liberation Army of China for regular consultations and interactions between the two armies to improve relations.

Nepalese claims 

The Nepalese claims to the southern side of the pass, called Kalapani territory, are based on 1816 Sagauli Treaty between British East India Company and Nepal. The treaty delimited the boundary along the Kali River (also called the Sharda River and Mahakali River). India claims that the river begins at the Kalapani village as this is where all its tributaries merge. But Nepal claims that it begins from the Lipulekh Pass.
The historical record shows that, some time around 1865, the British shifted the border near Kalapani to the watershed of the Kalapani river instead of the river itself, thereby claiming the area now called the Kalapani territory. This is consistent with the British position that the Kali River begins only from the Kalapani springs, which meant that the agreement of Sugauli did not apply to the region above the springs.

After the Indian prime minister's visit to China in 2015, India and China agreed to open a trading post in Lipulekh, raising objections from Nepal. The Nepalese parliament stated that 'it violates Nepal's sovereign rights over the disputed territory'.   Nepal now intends to resolve the issue via diplomatic means with India.

See also
Nathu La
Shipki La
Dharchula

References

Bibliography

External links
 Photographs of the Lipulekh Pass

China–India border crossings
Geography of Pithoragarh district
Mountain passes of Uttarakhand
Mountain passes of Tibet
Mountain passes of the Himalayas
Territorial disputes of Nepal